Armillaria is a genus of fungi that includes the A. mellea species known as honey fungi that live on trees and woody shrubs. It includes about 10 species formerly categorized summarily as A. mellea. Armillarias are long-lived and form the largest living fungi in the world. Some species of Armillaria display bioluminescence, resulting in foxfire.

Armillaria can be a destructive forest pathogen. It causes "white rot" root disease (see Plant pathology section) of forests, which distinguishes it from Tricholoma, a mycorrhizal (non-parasitic) genus. Because Armillaria is a facultative saprophyte, it also feeds on dead plant material, allowing it to kill its host, unlike parasites that must moderate their growth to avoid host death.

Description 

The basidiocarp (reproductive structure) of the fungus is a mushroom that grows on wood, typically in small dense clumps or tufts. Their caps (mushroom tops) are typically yellow-brown, somewhat sticky to touch when moist, and, depending on age, may range in shape from conical to convex to depressed in the center. The stipe (stalk) may or may not have a ring. All Armillaria species have a white spore print and none have a volva (cup at base) (compare Amanita).

Similar species include Pholiota spp. which also grow in cespitose (mat-like) clusters on wood and fruit in the fall. Pholiota spp. are separated from Armillaria by its yellowish to greenish-yellow tone and a dark brown to grey-brown spore print. Mushroom hunters need to be wary of Galerina  spp. which can grow side by side with Armillaria spp. on wood. Galerina have a dark brown spore print and are deadly poisonous (alpha-amanitin) – see: mushroom poisoning.

Fungus pathology 

Honey fungus is a "white rot" fungus, which is a pathogenic organism that affects trees, shrubs, woody climbers and rarely, woody herbaceous perennial plants. Honey fungus can grow on living, decaying, and dead plant material.

Honey fungus spreads from living trees, dead and live roots and stumps by means of reddish-brown to black rhizomorphs (root-like structures) at the rate of approximately  a year, but infection by root contact is possible. Infection by spores is rare. Rhizomorphs grow close to the soil surface (in the top ) and invade new roots, or the root collar (where the roots meet the stem) of plants. An infected tree will die once the fungus has girdled it, or when significant root damage has occurred. This can happen rapidly, or may take several years. Infected plants will deteriorate, although may exhibit prolific flower or fruit production shortly before death.

Initial symptoms of honey fungus infection include dieback or shortage of leaves in spring. Rhizomorphs (also called mycelial cords) appear under the bark and around the tree, and mushrooms grow in clusters from the infected plant in autumn and die back after the first frost. However these symptoms and signs do not necessarily mean that the pathogenic strains of honey fungus are the cause, so other identification methods are advised before diagnosis. Thin sheets of cream colored mycelium, beneath the bark at the base of the trunk or stem indicated that honey fungus is likely the pathogen. It will give off a strong mushroom scent and the mushrooms sometimes extend upward. On conifers honey fungus often exudes a gum or resin from cracks in the bark.

Taxonomy
The name Armillaria was defined in 1821 by Fries, but at that time most gilled mushrooms were considered to belong to genus Agaricus and Armillaria was only a subgenus (a "tribe").  It was only in 1857 that Friedrich Staude created it as a genus in its own right.

The linkage of morphological, genetic, and molecular characters of Armillaria over the past few decades has led to the recognition of intersterile groups designated as "biological species". Data from such studies, especially those using molecular diagnostic tools, have removed much uncertainty for mycologists and forest pathologists. New questions remain unanswered regarding the phylogeny of North American Armillaria species and their relationships to their European counterparts, particularly within the "Armillaria mellea complex". Some data suggest that North American and European A. gallica isolates are not monophyletic. Although North American and European isolates of A. gallica may be interfertile, some North American isolates of A. gallica are more closely related to the North American taxon A. calvescens than to European isolates of A. gallica. The increase in genetic divergence has not necessarily barred inter-sterility between isolated populations of A. gallica. Although the relationships among some groups in the genus seem clearer, the investigation of geographically diverse isolates has revealed that the relationship between some North American species is still unclear (Hughes et al. 2003).

Intersterile species of Armillaria occurring in North America (North American Biological Species = NABS) were listed by Mallett (1992):

 I Armillaria ostoyae (Romagn.) Herink
 II Armillaria gemina Bérubé & Dessureault
 III Armillaria calvescens Bérubé & Dessureault
 V Armillaria sinapina Bérubé & Dessureault
 VI Armillaria mellea (Vahl.:Fries) Kummer
 VII Armillaria gallica (Marxmüller & Romagn.)
 IX  Armillaria nabsnona T. J. Volk & Burds. (1996)
 X   Armillaria altimontana Brazee, B. Ortiz, Banik & D. L. Lindner (2012)
 XI taxonomically undescribed

NABS I, V, VII, IX, X, and XI have been found in British Columbia; I, III, V have been found in the Prairie Provinces, with I and V occurring in both the boreal and subalpine regions; I, III, V, and VII have been found in Ontario; and I, II, III, V, and VI have been found in Quebec. Armillaria ostoyae is the species most commonly found in all Canadian provinces surveyed (Mallett 1990). Armillaria root rot occurs in the Northwest Territories, and was identified on white spruce at Pine Point on Great Slave Lake prior to NABS findings.

In 1791 Albrecht Wilhelm Roth described the species Rhizomorpha fragilis for a collection which consisted entirely of rhizomorphs.  The genus Rhizomorpha thus became established and later these mycelial cords were shown to belong to Armillaria mellea.  According to the code of nomenclature that means that the two genus names are synonyms and since genus Armillaria was not defined until 1857, the name Rhizomorpha takes precedence and should replace the name Armillaria.  To avoid this a 2021 paper by Stalpers et al. proposes that the name Armillaria should be protected.  However the proposal awaits decisions by the Nomenclature Committee for Fungi and eventually by an International Botanical Congress.

Edibility 

Honey fungus are regarded in Ukraine, Russia, Poland, Germany and other European countries as one of the best wild mushrooms. They are commonly ranked above morels and chanterelles and only the cep/porcini is more highly prized. However, honey fungus must be thoroughly cooked as they are mildly poisonous raw. Honey mushrooms are one of four UK species that can cause sickness when ingested with alcohol. For those unfamiliar with the species, it is advisable not to drink alcohol for 12 hours before and 24 hours after eating this mushroom to avoid any possible nausea and vomiting. However, if these rules are followed this variety of mushroom is a delicacy with a distinctive mushroomy and nutty flavour. Reference texts for identification are Collins Complete British Mushrooms and Toadstools for the variety of field pictures in it, and Roger Philips' Mushrooms for the quality of his out of field pictures and descriptions.

In Norway, some mycologists have started to regard honey fungus as poisonous, as the Norway health department is moving away from the parboiling practice.

Hosts

Potential hosts include conifers and various monocotyledonous and dicotyledonous trees, shrubs, and herbaceous species, ranging from asparagus and strawberry to large forest trees (Patton and Vasquez Bravo 1967). Armillaria root rot enters hosts through the roots. In Alberta, 75% of trap logs (Mallett and Hiratsuka 1985) inserted into the soil between planted spruce became infected with the distinctive white mycelium of Armillaria within one year. Of the infestations, 12% were A. ostoyae, and 88% were A. sinapina (Blenis et al. 1995). Reviews of the biology, diversity, pathology, and control of Armillaria in Fox (2000) are useful.

See also 

 Bioluminescence
 Foxfire
 List of Armillaria species

References

External links 

Images of Armillaria species

 
Fungal tree pathogens and diseases
Agaricales genera
Bioluminescent fungi